The Sphinx of Agost is a Greek-influenced Iberian limestone sculpture, dated from the late sixth century BCE, that was found in the Agost reservoir in Alicante, Spain, in 1893.

The badly damaged statue is 82 cm high and represents a sphinx with the head of a woman, body of a winged lion and tail of a snake. This particular sphinx may have been included in an Iberian tomb to carry the soul of the deceased to the afterlife.

The Sphinx of Agost is on display at the National Archaeological Museum (Madrid).

Notes

References
Agost's town council

6th-century BC sculptures
1893 archaeological discoveries
European sculpture
Archaeological discoveries in Spain
Ancient history of the Iberian Peninsula
Iberian art
Collection of the National Archaeological Museum, Madrid
Limestone sculptures
Sculptures in Madrid
Stone sculptures in Spain
Sphinxes